Nacanieli Mataika "Nat" Uluiviti (19 May 1932 – 6 May 2004) was a Fijian cricketer, rugby union player and politician, serving in the Senate.

Cricket
A right-handed batsman and right-arm medium pace bowler, he played first-class cricket for both the Fiji national cricket team and Auckland in the 1950s.

He made his first-class debut against Otago on Fiji's 1954 tour of New Zealand, playing three further matches on the tour. He then attended university in New Zealand, and played four first-class matches for Auckland in the Plunket Shield.

Rugby union
Uluiviti played at full-back for the Fiji national rugby union team's tour of New Zealand in 1957, playing two Tests against the New Zealand Māori, scoring 23 points in total.

See also
List of Auckland representative cricketers

References

1932 births
2004 deaths
Fijian cricketers
Fijian rugby union players
Auckland cricketers
Fiji international rugby union players
Fijian expatriate rugby union players
Expatriate rugby union players in New Zealand
Fijian expatriate sportspeople in New Zealand
Auckland rugby union players
Sportspeople from Suva
I-Taukei Fijian people
Members of the Senate (Fiji)